GVH may refer to:

 Gravelly Hill railway station, in Birmingham, England
 Großraum-Verkehr Hannover, a German transport association